Deakins is a surname, and may refer to:

James Deakins, fictional character on Law & Order: Criminal Intent
Joanne Deakins (born 1972), British backstroke swimmer
Lucy Deakins (born 1971), American actress
Peter Deakins, British architect
Roger Deakins (born 1949), British cinematographer

See also
Deakin (surname)